Turn Store and the Tinsmith's Shop, also known as Turn's Bushkill General Store, are two historic commercial buildings located in the Delaware Water Gap National Recreation Area at Lehman Township, Pike County, Pennsylvania.  The Turn General Store is a 2- to 2 1/2-story, frame building in two sections.  The older section dates to about 1837 and is at the rear of the present building.  Attached to the front is an addition built about 1916.  The Tinsmith's Shop was built about 1837, and is a two-story, frame building on a fieldstone foundation.  It has a slate covered gable roof.

In the 1990s it was sold to Guy Gentile and became "Deli Depot" which sold grocery, deli, and craft items.

It was added to the National Register of Historic Places in 1978.

In 2012 Anthony and Vanessa Palma purchased and restored the building. It now operates as The Roost Deli and Market.

References

Commercial buildings on the National Register of Historic Places in Pennsylvania
Commercial buildings completed in 1837
Commercial buildings completed in 1916
Buildings and structures in Pike County, Pennsylvania
National Register of Historic Places in Pike County, Pennsylvania